The 2013–14 season of the Israeli Futsal League was the 8th season of top-tier futsal under the Israel Football Association and 14th overall. The regular season started on 1 March 2014 and was concluded on 3 May 2014. The championship playoffs began on 8 May 2014 with a semi-finals match and concluded with the championship final, played on 16 May.

ASA Ben-Gurion University, the defending champions, retained the title by defeating Rishon LeZion Futsal Club on penalties in the final.

Format changes
With 8 clubs registered to play in the league, the clubs played each other in a single round-robin tournament. At the end of the regular season, the 2nd and 3rd placed teams played in a semi-final match, the winner meeting the top placed team in the final.

Regular season table

Playoffs

External links
Israeli Futsal League 2013-2014 IFA

References

Israeli Futsal League
Futsal
Israel